The United States Senate elections of 1930 in New Jersey was held on November 4, 1930.

Walter Evans Edge, the Senator elected in 1924, resigned in 1929 to take office as U.S. Ambassador to France. Interim appointee David Baird Jr. chose not to seek re-election and Republican Dwight Morrow won a landslide victory to succeed him.

Morrow also won a special election held the same day for the remaining month of Edge's six-year term, defeating Democrat Thelma Parkinson. Morrow would only serve for ten months before his death in October 1931.

Background
In July 1929, President Herbert Hoover announced his selection of Senator Walter Evans Edge as United States Ambassador to France. However, Edge's appointment and resignation from the Senate were delayed for political purposes.

By resigning after October 5, 1929, Edge empowered Governor Morgan F. Larson to appoint a successor rather than leave the seat vacant until the fall election, when two elections would be held: a special election to complete Edge's term and a regular election for the six-year term beginning in 1931. Larson publicly pledged to appoint David Baird Jr., who was widely expected to run to run in the June primary. Before Edge's appointment, there had been rumors that Hoover sought to have Larson appoint Dwight Morrow instead; Larson denied the charge.

Republican primary

Candidates
Franklin W. Fort, U.S. Representative from East Orange
Joseph Frelinghuysen, former U.S. Senator (1917–23) and candidate for Senate in 1928
John A. Kelly
Dwight Morrow, U.S. Ambassador to Mexico and former partner at J.P. Morgan & Co.

Declined
David Baird Jr., interim Senator

Campaign
Dwight Morrow, U.S. Ambassador to Mexico, father of Anne Morrow Lindbergh, and one of the richest men in the state, was the front-runner for the nomination. Morrow took little part in the early campaign. Shortly after announcing his candidacy in the spring, he left to participate in the London Naval Conference.

Upon his entry, Morrow's chief opponent was former U.S. Senator Joseph S. Frelinghuysen Sr., who had announced his candidacy even before Edge's appointment and resignation. Frelinghuysen stressed his campaign as a challenge to the establishment, identifying Morrow as an ally of the "Baird-Larson-Kean" group which controlled all of New Jersey's statewide offices, which Frelinghuysen termed "machine domination." Frelinghuysen additionally suggested Baird's appointment had been orchestrated by the machine to allow Morrow to avoid controversial votes, such as on the Smoot-Hawley Tariff, which Frelinghuysen supported. State party chairman E. Bertram Mott responded that the state committee took no official side in the primary, though "a great majority ... [were] in favor of Mr. Morrow for the nomination."

One of Morrow's few public statements during the campaign came in his opening speech on May 16, which called for a repeal of the Eighteenth Amendment to the United States Constitution. Opponents of prohibition, including Governor Larson and Democratic candidate Alexander S. Simpson, praised his statement, while critics compared him unfavorably to Al Smith. Outside of the state, his comments were taken as evidence that prohibition was failing. His chief critic on the issue was Representative Franklin W. Fort, who entered the race late as a candidate of the Anti-Saloon League. Conceding that Prohibition would be repealed some time in the future, Fort focused his attacks on Morrow's alliance with Atlantic City boss Nucky Johnson, who Fort argued would prevent Morrow from supporting any enforcement of the Volstead Act in the intervening years.

Frelinghuysen attempted to reframe the contest as a debate over foreign policy, criticizing Morrow's role negotiating the London Naval Treaty, which he argued left the United States needing billions in naval spending, and accusing Morrow of failing to oppose the League of Nations and World Court. As the race came to a close, Frelinghuysen attacked both Morrow and Fort for evading key issues.

Results

Democratic primary

Candidates
Alexander Simpson, State Senator for Hudson County

Results
Simpson was unopposed for the Democratic nomination.

General election

Candidates
Esther Hill Elfreth (National Prohibition)
Henry Jager (Socialist)
Dozier Will Graham (Communist)
Alexander Kudlik (Socialist Labor)
Dwight Morrow (Republican), U.S. Ambassador to Mexico
Alexander Simpson (Democrat), State Senator from Hudson County

Results

Results by county

See also 
1930 United States Senate elections

References

New Jersey
1930
1930 New Jersey elections